Archigalleria is a genus of snout moths. It was described by Rebel, in 1901, and contains the species A. proavitella. It is found on the Canary Islands.

The wingspan is about 36 mm.

References

Phycitinae
Monotypic moth genera
Moths of Africa